Ahn Hyang (안향, 安珦; 1243 – 12 September 1306), also known as Ahn Yu (안유, 安裕), was a leading Confucian scholar born in Yeongju in present-day South Korea, and was from the Sunheung Ahn clan. He is considered the founder of Neo-Confucianism in Korea, introducing Song Confucianism to the Goryeo kingdom. Ahn Hyang visited China, transcribing the works of Zhu Xi and bringing his copy and portraits of Confucius and Zhu Xi to Korea to use in his revitalization of Confucianism. He strove to replace Buddhism with Confucianism.

There is a portrait of him at the Sosu Seowon, which was built as a memorial to the scholar.  There is also a statue of him on Banya-san in Nonsan.

Family 
 Grandfather
 Ahn Yeong-yu (안영유, 安永儒/安永濡) (1201 - ?)
 Grandmother 
 Lady Park of the Gyeongju Park clan (경주 박씨); daughter of Park Hwang (박황, 朴璜)
 Father 
 Ahn Bu (안부, 安孚) (1220 - ?)
 Mother 
 Princess Consort Sunjeong of the Gangju Woo clan (순정군부인 강주우씨, 順政郡夫人 剛州禹氏)
 Grandfather - Woo Seong-yun (우성윤, 禹成允)
 Wives and their children
 Princess Consort Hannam of the Kim clan (한남군부인 김씨, 漢南郡夫人 金氏); Kim Rok-yeon's third daughter (김록연,金祿延)
 Son - Ahn Woo-gi (안우기, 安于器) (1265 - 1329)
 Daughter-in-law - Princess Consort Cheorwon of the Choi clan (철원군부인 최씨)
 Grandson - Ahn Mok (안목, 安牧)
 Daughter-in-law - Princess Consort Yi (군부인 이씨)
 Grandson - Ahn Shin (안신, 安愼)
 Daughter - Lady Ahn of the Sunheung Ahn clan (순흥 안씨, 順興 安氏)
 Son-in-law - Moon Ok (문욱, 文頊)
 Daughter - Lady Ahn of the Sunheung Ahn clan (순흥 안씨, 順興 安氏)
 Son-in-law - Heo Su (허수, 許綏)
 Daughter - Lady Ahn of the Sunheung Ahn clan (순흥 안씨, 順興 安氏)
 Son-in-law - Park Je (박제)
 Daughter - Lady Ahn of the Sunheung Ahn clan (순흥 안씨, 順興 安氏)
 Son-in-law - Han Su-yeon (한수연, 韓守延)
 Daughter - Lady Ahn of the Sunheung Ahn clan (순흥 안씨, 順興 安氏)
 Son-in-law - Kim Sa-won (김사원, 金士元)
 Princess Consort Seowon of the Yeom clan (서원군부인 염씨, 瑞原郡夫人 廉氏); daughter of Yeom Su-jang (염수장, 廉守藏) — No issue.

References

 tourinfo.khu.ac.kr/iboard/bbsUpFiles/제%205호.hwp
 Grayson, James H.  2002 Korea - A Religious History.  RoutledgeCurzon. .

People from Yeongju
1243 births
1306 deaths
Neo-Confucian scholars
Place of death unknown
Sunheung An clan
13th-century Korean philosophers